Warrimoo railway station is located on the Main Western line in New South Wales, Australia. It serves the Blue Mountains suburb of Warrimoo opening on 9 March 1918.

History
While the Great Western Railway was built through the Blue Mountains in 1867, it was originally established in the area as Karabar platform. After a name change a new platform was built in 1918. This platform was later destroyed as a result of bush fire in 1951 and was later rebuilt.

A pedestrian bridge was built in 1917 to provide access to the station and in 1990 alterations were made.

The station celebrated its 100th Anniversary on 9 March 2018.

Platforms and services
Warrimoo has one island platform with two sides. It is serviced by NSW TrainLink Blue Mountains Line services travelling from Sydney Central to Lithgow.

Transport links
Blue Mountains Transit operates one route via Warrimoo station:
690P: Springwood station to Penrith station

References

External links

Warrimoo station details Transport for New South Wales

Railway stations in Australia opened in 1918
Regional railway stations in New South Wales
Short-platform railway stations in New South Wales, 6 cars
Main Western railway line, New South Wales